The Deere-Clark Motor Car Company was a manufacturer of automobiles in Moline, Illinois from 1906 to 1907.

History

The Deere was an American Automobile built by The Deere-Clark Motor Car Co. in 1906 and 1907. Charles Deere was president of The Deere-Clark Motor co. and W. E. Clark was vice-president.

Advertisements

References

Motor vehicle manufacturers based in Illinois
Defunct motor vehicle manufacturers of the United States
Defunct manufacturing companies based in Illinois